Muhlenbergia minutissima is a species of grass known by the common name annual muhly. It is native to North America.

Distribution
It is found throughout the western United States and much of Mexico. It can be found in many habitat types, including disturbed areas.

Description
It is an annual bunchgrass growing 30 centimeters tall. The inflorescence is an open, spreading array of hair-thin branches bearing millimeter-long spikelets.

External links
Jepson Manual Treatment
USDA Plants Profile
Grass Manual Treatment
Photo gallery

minutissima
Bunchgrasses of North America
Grasses of the United States
Grasses of Mexico
Native grasses of California
Native grasses of Texas
Flora of the Northwestern United States
Flora of the Southwestern United States
Flora of the Sierra Nevada (United States)
Flora of New Mexico
Natural history of the Transverse Ranges
Flora without expected TNC conservation status